The Wold Shadow is an experimental short film by Stan Brakhage, produced in 1972.

Production

The Wold Shadow was inspired when Stan Brakhage, while walking through a forest, had a vision of an anthropomorphic shadow. The experience led him to film a homage to the "god of the forest." The Wold Shadow was produced by placing glass on an easel between his camera and the forest. Between each individual frame, Brakhage painted on the glass, before repeating this process. Production of The Wold Shadow took a full day. Brakhage credits the film with reigniting his interest in painting, and described his choice of title as follows:
"Wold" because the word refers to "forests" which poets later made "plains" and because the work also contains the rustic sense "to kill" - this then my laboriously painted vision of the god of the forest.

Reception
Martin Rumsby cites The Wold Shadow as a rare instance of Brakhage attempting a work of structural cinema in Senses of Cinema. He nevertheless acknowledges that the film is more "romantic" than most structural films, in that Brakhage is "trying to capture or evoke something mysterious and unknowable." P. Adams Sitney considers The Wold Shadow a continuation of themes expressed in the poetry of Ezra Pound.

See also
 List of American films of 1972

References

External links
 

1972 films
Films directed by Stan Brakhage
1970s English-language films
1970s American films